Black is a 2015 Indo-Bangla Bengali crime action film directed by Raja Chanda, and starring Soham Chakraborty and Bangladeshi actress Bidya Sinha Saha Mim in lead roles. The film was jointly produced by Viacom 18 Motion Pictures and Dag Creative Media. It was released in India on 27 November 2015, and in Bangladesh on 4 December 2015.

The film revolves around a man named, Biltu, who takes vengeance to those who framed his father (a police officer) with false charges and as a result the latter commits suicide to get rid of this humiliation.

Cast
 Soham Chakraborty as Bullet / Biltu
 Bidya Sinha Saha Mim as Tina
 Ashish Vidyarthi as encounter specialist Biru Panday
 Kharaj Mukherjee as Anwar
 Rudranil Ghosh as Roni
 Rajatava Dutta as Samrat Sarkar, a corrupt businessman
 Amit Hasan as DGP Dilip Chatterji
 Kanchan Mullick
 Biswanath Basu
 Barkha Sengupta in an item number song "Moyna Cholat Cholat" (special appearance)
 Kushal Chakraborty as Biltu's father, ACP
 Rebeka Rouf as Anwar's wife

Soundtrack

References

2015 films
Bengali-language Indian films
Bengali-language Bangladeshi films
2010s Bengali-language films
2015 crime action films
Films scored by Dabbu
Indian crime action films
Viacom18 Studios films
Films directed by Raja Chanda